Ten Years Thailand is a 2018 Thai independent dystopian anthology film written and directed by Aditya Assarat, Wisit Sasanatieng, Chulayarnon Siriphol and Apichatpong Weerasethakul. Based in format on the 2015 Hong Kong film Ten Years, its four segments each offers the director's speculative take on a dystopian Thailand in 2028. The film was shown in the special screenings section at the 2018 Cannes Film Festival. A fifth segment, by Chookiat Sakveerakul, was not completed in time for the Cannes screening.

References

External links
 

2018 films
Dystopian films
Thai-language films
Thai science fiction films
Hong Kong science fiction films
Japanese science fiction films
Films directed by Apichatpong Weerasethakul